Jeremy Barrett may refer to:

 Jeremy Barrett (artist) (born 1936), Australian artist
 Jeremy Barrett (figure skater) (born 1984), American pair skater